Zacarías Colque Matías (born 8 February 1967) is a Bolivian agricultural worker, politician, and trade unionist who served as a member of the Chamber of Deputies from Potosí, representing circumscription 38 from 2015 to 2020. A member of the Movement for Socialism, Colque built his career in northern Potosí's rural trade syndicates. The party's long-established alliance with the agrarian sector facilitated Colque's entry into politics, first as a member of the Caripuyo Municipal Council and much later as a parliamentarian.

Early life and career 
Zacarías Colque was born on 8 February 1967 in Caripuyo, a rural locality situated in the Alonso de Ibáñez Province of northern Potosí, one of the most isolated and least economically developed regions in the country, home to the nation's most impoverished municipality: the very same Caripuyo. An ethnic Quechua, Colque spent his early life in rural poverty, making a living as an agricultural worker before becoming active in the regional's peasant labor movement. 

These positions opened the door to more prominent roles, and he topped off his union career as executive secretary of the Unified Syndical Federation of Native Workers of Northern Potosí.

Chamber of Deputies

Election 

As a leader in Potosí's agrarian syndicates, Colque represented a confluence of social movements: organized labor first and foremost, but also the peasantry, as well as the indigenous movement. The organic alliance between these three groups with the nascent Movement for Socialism (MAS-IPSP) facilitated Colque's entry into politics. Having served as president of the MAS's branch in Caripuyo, he achieved his first elective position locally, serving as a member and eventual president of the Caripuyo Municipal Council.

Absent from ensuing election cycles, Colque returned to the political scene in 2014, with his nomination for a seat in the Chamber of Deputies. He ran to represent the MAS in Potosí's circumscription 38, encompassing the department's northern provinces. In one of the bastions of electoral support for the party, Colque won without any significant competition.

Tenure 
In office, Colque focused his parliamentary term on indigenous matters, supporting projects to recognize and promote native culture and occupying positions on committees related to the topic. He held a seat on the Planning Commission's Indigenous Jurisdiction Committee and chaired both the Indigenous Peoples and Nations Committee and the Cultures Committee, the former for two terms and the latter for one. As with the vast majority of legislators who entered parliament in representation of MAS-aligned groups, Colque was not nominated for reelection, reflecting the party's practice of renewing its electoral lists to make way for new leaders from allied social sectors.

Commission assignments 
 Plural Economy, Production, and Industry Commission
 Rural Native Indigenous Jurisdiction Committee (–)
 Rural Native Indigenous Peoples and Nations, Cultures, and Interculturality Commission
 Cultures, Interculturality, and Cultural Heritage Committee (Secretary: –)
 Rural Native Indigenous Peoples and Nations Committee (Secretary: –, –)
 Amazon Region, Land, Territory, Water, Natural Resources, and Environment Commission
 Amazon Region, Land, and Territory Committee (–)

Electoral history

References

Notes

Footnotes

Bibliography

External links 
 Deputies profile Vice Presidency .
 Deputies profile Chamber of Deputies . Archived from the original on 7 July 2020.

1967 births
Living people
21st-century Bolivian politicians
Bolivian municipal councillors
Bolivian people of Quechua descent
Bolivian politicians of indigenous peoples descent
Bolivian trade union leaders
Members of the Bolivian Chamber of Deputies from Potosí
Movement for Socialism (Bolivia) politicians
People from Alonso de Ibáñez Province
Quechua politicians